Turbo cidaris, common name the crown turban, is a species of sea snail, marine gastropod mollusk in the family Turbinidae.

Some authors place the name in the subgenus Turbo (Sarmaticus)

Subspecies
 Turbo cidaris cidaris Gmelin, 1791
 Turbo cidaris natalensis (Krauss, 1848) (synonyms: Turbo natalensis Krauss, 1848; Turbo natalensis var. unicolor Turton, 1932)

Description
The length of the shell varies between 25 mm and 60 mm.
The imperforate, smooth and polished shell has a depressed, heliciform shape. Its color pattern is reddish, brown or yellow, usually flammulated above, variously marked below, with white. The spire is short and contains 5–6 whorls. The upper ones are bicarinate, the last often considerably descending, and rounded. The aperture is circular, oblique, and white within, rounded below. The wide columella is callous, and is excavated at the umbilical region.

The operculum is slightly concave inside, with six whorls and a subcentral apex. The outer surface is sharply granulate, white, convex, spiral, with a central pit.

Distribution
This species occurs in the Indian Ocean off Mozambique and South Africa. It has also been found off Angola and Indonesia.

References

 Kilburn, R.N. (1974) Taxonomic notes on South African marine Mollusca (3): Gastropoda: Prosobranchia, with descriptions of new taxa of Naticidae, Fasciolariidae, Magilidae, Volutomitridae and Turridae. Annals of the Natal Museum, 22, 187–220.
 Steyn, D.G. & Lussi, M. (1998) Marine Shells of South Africa. An Illustrated Collector’s Guide to Beached Shells. Ekogilde Publishers, Hartebeespoort, South Africa, ii + 264 pp. page(s): 26
 Branch, G.M. et al. (2002). Two Oceans. 5th impression. David Philip, Cate Town & Johannesburg
 Alf A. & Kreipl K. (2003). A Conchological Iconography: The Family Turbinidae, Subfamily Turbininae, Genus Turbo. Conchbooks, Hackenheim Germany.
 Williams, S.T. (2007). Origins and diversification of Indo-West Pacific marine fauna: evolutionary history and biogeography of turban shells (Gastropoda, Turbinidae). Biological Journal of the Linnean Society, 2007, 92, 573–592.

External links
 

cidaris
Gastropods described in 1791
Taxa named by Johann Friedrich Gmelin